Preserving sugar is a kind of sugar used for making marmalades, jams and preserves using fruits that are naturally high in pectin (such as plums, redcurrants, blackcurrants, gooseberries, greengages, damsons and Seville oranges). The large sugar crystals dissolve more slowly than those of standard granulated sugar and do not settle in the bottom of the pot or rise up as froth to the surface.  This reduces the risk of burning and the consequent need for stirring. It also allows impurities to rise for easier skimming. Because it minimizes scum, it helps to make jams and jellies clearer.

Preserving sugar differs from gelling sugar, also called jam sugar, because the latter contains pectin while preserving sugar is 100% sugar.

References 

Sugars